Ralph Ginn (July 23, 1907 – May 26, 1972) was an American football and basketball player and coach. He served as the head football coach at Tarkio College in Tarkio, Missouri from  1941 to 1942 and South Dakota State University from 1947 to 1968, compiling a career college football coaching record of 115–101–10. Ginn was also the head basketball coach at Wayne State College in Wayne, Nebraska from 1942 to 1944 tallying a mark of 18–9. Ginn died on May 26, 1972, at St. Mary's Hospital in Pierre, South Dakota.

Head coaching record

References

1907 births
1972 deaths
Basketball coaches from Iowa
South Dakota State Jackrabbits football coaches
Tarkio Owls football coaches
Tarkio Owls football players
Tarkio Owls men's basketball coaches
Wayne State Wildcats men's basketball coaches
High school football coaches in Missouri
High school football coaches in South Dakota
People from Lenox, Iowa
Players of American football from Iowa